The Sawyer-Barrow House, first known as the Joseph Sawyer House, and then for 78 years as the summer estate Twin Maples, was built  for Joseph Sawyer (1778-1849) by the Western Reserve's master builder Jonathan Goldsmith. the house is located in Mentor, Ohio.

Location 

The house was originally located on the southwestern corner of Mentor Avenue and Chillicothe Road in Mentor, Ohio. From 1885 to 1922 it was stop 66 on the Cleveland, Painesville, and Eastern Intraurban line.

In 1961, it was moved a mile south to 9364 Forsythe Lane.

History 

Arriving in 1811 from Pompey, New York, Joseph Sawyer's family was one of the earliest pioneers to settle in the Connecticut Western Reserve area of Ohio. He built one of the first Gristmills in the area and around 1825 he contracted with Jonathan Goldsmith to build a new home in the Greek Revival style. By the time of his death in 1849 Joseph had amassed over 1,100 acres, making his one of the largest farms in Lake County, Ohio. The house remained in the family until 1883 when Joseph's grandson sold it to Luthur L. Cook, a prominent businessman who founded L. L. Cook & Brothers.

It was during this next era that the home was known as Twin Maples. For the next 78 years it was the summer home to a number of wealthy Cleveland businessmen who originally used the Cleveland, Painesville, and Eastern Intraurban line to travel the 25 miles between their winter and summer homes. It was this same line that provided electrical and telephone service to the house.

In 1961, the land was purchased by a local developer, Richard Defranco, to build a gas station but the house was spared as it was moved a mile up the road. The house was extensively updated by another developer, Richard Swerling. One oddity was when the house was moved to the new T-shaped lot it was placed at the end of a long driveway so the old front faced away from the road and into the woods. From the road, with a new garage added, it now gives the appearance of a 1970s colonial because the old front isn't easily visible.

Jonathan Goldsmith 
Jonathan Gillett Goldsmith (1784-1847) designed and built the Sawyer-Barrow house. Goldsmith is considered one of the leading architects of the Connecticut Western Reserve. In Lake County, he built 40 cottages and mansions, four taverns, the Fairport Harbor Lighthouse, a business block, the 
Painesville National Bank, a school, and with Grand Newell, the Fairport, Painesville, Warren Railroad.

His work was important enough that one of his homes, the Robinson Elwell House was saved by the Western Reserve Historical Society and moved to become the centerpiece of its Hale Farm & Village property. Another of his homes, the Mathews House, was also saved at the Lake Erie College campus. Both are almost identical in design to the Sawyer-Barrow house. Goldsmith was considered such a master architect of the Greek Revival style that when the Isaac Gillet House was demolished, the front door was saved and is now on permanent display at the Cleveland Museum of Art. 

Goldsmith married Abigail Jones (1787-1887) on June 6, 1809 in Hinsdale, Massachusetts. They had eleven children, one of whom was Delos Goldsmith who became a carpenter and master builder in Carmel-by-the-Sea, California. His niece, Abbie Jane Hunter (Goldsmith) (1855-1918), was a successful businesswoman, real estate developer, and visionary of Carmel-by-the-Sea.

Goldsmith died on September 17, 1847 at the age of 64, and was buried at the Painesville Township cemetery. His legacy is in his buildings and with his trademark fluted molding and corner blocks.

Further reading 
 The Architecture of Mentor, Ohio; a Guide to Historic Buildings
 Mentor - a Retrospective
 Architecture of the Western Reserve 1800-1900
 Mentor: The First 200 Years
 Historic country estates in Lake County, Ohio

References

External links 
 1898 Lake County Atlas Mentor Twp. Russel Lot
 1915 Lake County Atlas Mentor Twp. Russel Lot
Lists of buildings and structures in Ohio
1825 establishments in Ohio